Frederik Marcus Knuth, 9th count of Knuthenborg (5 May 1904 – 14 June 1970) was a Danish taxonomist especially known for the collection and classification of cactuses. He collected and described many new species.

According to the Bovrup File Knuth was a member of DNSAP.

References 

1904 births
1970 deaths
20th-century Danish botanists
20th-century Danish landowners
Botanists active in South America
Danish counts
Danish explorers
Danish Nazis
Knuth family